Blue Hills of Massachusetts, written by Katherine E. Mullen of Barre, was designated the official poem of the Commonwealth of Massachusetts by the Massachusetts General Court in 1981.

See also
List of U.S. state poems

References

External links
Massachusetts State Poem

American poems
Symbols of Massachusetts